Ben Daniel Rydel is an English footballer who plays as a midfielder for Radcliffe. A product of Salford City's academy, he spent time on loan at City of Liverpool, where he made his first senior appearances, and Radcliffe.

Career
Born in Oldham, Rydel is a product of the Salford City academy, having the joined the club aged 15, captaining Salford's Under-18 team on several occasions during his first two seasons at the club. In July 2021, Rydel signed his first professional contract, a one-year contract which would also see him move into the development squad. In August, he was loaned to Northern Premier League Division One West team City of Liverpool. He scored his first goal for the club against Farsley Celtic, scoring The Purps third in a 3–0 win as the club reached the third qualifying round for the first time, a goal described as a "majestic" free-kick.

Rydel made his Salford debut on 5 October 2021, starting the EFL Trophy fixture against Tranmere Rovers. Three days later, he joined Northern Premier League Premier Division team Radcliffe on a month-long loan, and on his debut the following day, he scored the equaliser from a free-kick as Radcliffe came from two down to make the game 2–2 against Buxton in an eventual 3–2 defeat. He remained at the club until the end of December before returning to Salford. In February 2022 he returned to Radcliffe on loan for the remainder of the season. In June 2022, following his release from Salford, Rydel returned to Radcliffe on a permanent deal for a third spell.

Career statistics

References

External links

Living people
English footballers
Association football midfielders
Salford City F.C. players
Salford City F.C. academy graduates
City of Liverpool F.C. players
Radcliffe F.C. players
English Football League players
Year of birth missing (living people)
Northern Premier League players